Noth is a German surname. Notable people with the surname include:
 Chris Noth (born 1954), American film and television actor
 Martin Noth (1902–1968), German scholar of the Hebrew Bible 
 Winfried Nöth (born 1944), German linguist and semiotician